In 1993 two separate reviews reported on the British honours system.  The first, under prime minister John Major, reported in March and focused on civilian awards.  The second was started in March, at Major's suggestion, and carried out by the Ministry of Defence.   Major's review abolished the minimum rank requirements for certain civilian awards when made to military personnel and ended the practice of making awards purely on the basis of the recipient holding a certain appointment in the public or private sector (with the exception of High Court judges who were still to automatically become knights or dames).  Major's review also ended the award of the British Empire Medal (BEM) and Imperial Service Order, compensated for by increasing the number of awards made to the Order of the British Empire.  As a means of increasing the proportion of awards made to community figures and the voluntary sector he introduced direct nominations from the general public.

The outcome of the military review was reported by Minister of Defence Malcolm Rifkind in October 1993.  It was largely focused on gallantry awards.  The basic structure of the awards was retained but all distinctions of rank were removed, with officers and other ranks to receive the same awards for the same actions.  Generally the officer-level awards were retained (and opened to all ranks) and the other ranks award abolished.  A new Conspicuous Gallantry Cross was created as the second-level operational gallantry award for all ranks as the previous officer-level award (the Distinguished Service Order) was to henceforth be awarded for leadership and not gallantry.  The review considered creating a medal for the mention in dispatches award, but decided against this though the existing insignia, an oak leaf, was upgraded to silver (from bronze).  The Queen's Commendation for Valuable Service in the Air, which had been awarded for both gallantry and meritorious conduct, was abolished and replaced with new medals: the Queen's Commendation for Valuable Service which awarded meritorious conduct in all theatres and the Queen's Commendation for Bravery in the Air for non-operational gallantry.  The award of the Queen's Commendation for Brave Conduct was ended and replaced with the Queen's Commendation for Bravery for other non-operational gallantry.

Background 
The Conservative Party leader John Major was Prime Minister of the United Kingdom from 1990 to 1997.  He was keen to move towards a classless society and, as part of this, carried out a review of the British honours system.  Prior to Major's review the system had remained largely unchanged for 70 years.  Many honours, civil and military, were restricted to recipients of certain rank.  In the military officers received gallantry awards described as crosses (for example the Air Force Cross) while the other ranks received medals (for example the Air Force Medal).  The only gallantry medal without distinction to rank was the highest, the Victoria Cross.  This carried across to the civilian awards with other ranks generally not entitled to appointment to orders such as the Order of the British Empire, instead receiving the associated, but separate and lower ranking, British Empire Medal (BEM).

Major's review, which reported in March 1993, focussed on the civilian honours and ended the rank requirements there.  He made a recommendation that a similar review be completed into military awards with a view to making them "rankless".  The Ministry of Defence started a joint services (army, navy and air force) review in March 1993.  This reported later that year and Secretary of State for Defence Malcolm Rifkind announced, on 17 October 1993, that the distinction between officers and other ranks in the issuing of gallantry awards would be abolished.

Civil honours 

Major's review led to several significant changes in honours awarded.  He abolished the rank requirement for military personnel to receive appointments to the Order of the British Empire.  The requirements were retained by some Commonwealth realms which use the British honours system, though the number of such awards is proportionally very low.  Major considered that the link between the BEM and the order had become "increasingly tenuous" and halted the issue of the medal.  Candidates who would have previously been recommended for the BEM would receive appointments as members or officers of the Order of the British Empire instead.  Existing holders of the BEM were unaffected and Major increased the number of MBE appointments to make up for the abolition of the medal.  Recipients of the BEM, unlike those of the order, did not receive an investiture from a member of the royal family.  To allow for the increased number of appointments to the order to retain the option of an investiture Elizabeth II agreed to increase the number of ceremonies.  Appointees were also given the option of attending a ceremony locally, presided over by their Lord-Lieutenant.

Major ended appointments to the Imperial Service Order (ISO), which had a low public profile and was awarded mainly to civil servants.  Candidates who would previously have been recommended for this order would instead be nominated to appointment as officers of the Order of the British Empire.  This move did not affect the associated Imperial Service Medal which was retained as a long service award for civil servants.

Major stated that honours should be awarded "on merit; for exceptional achievement or exceptional service over and above that which might normally be expected" and ordered the end of automatic awards to those holding particular posts in the  public or private sector.  Under this order, for example, the automatic appointment of the Lord Mayor of London as a knight or dame grand cross of the Order of the British Empire ceased.  Major permitted only one exception, High Court judges continued to be appointed knights bachelor or dames of the Order of the British Empire upon appointment.

Major decided that the honours system should allow for more candidates from the voluntary sector and be more diverse.  He considered that minorities were under-represented on the honours lists, which were drawn up by government departments.  Major hoped to rebalance them by introducing direct nomination by members of the public.

Under the old system numbers of awards were determined every five years.  Major brought forwards the next review to summer 1993 and requested that it consider increasing awards for the voluntary sector and the general public and adjust the proportion of awards made to civil servants, diplomats and military personnel to reflect their changed role and size in recent years.  Major intended that the majority of appointments now made should be as members of the Order of the British Empire.

Effects and later changes 

The first effects of the reform were made in time for the 1993 Birthday Honours.  Major's reforms successfully increased the number and proportion of candidates from community, voluntary and local services who now form a majority of appointments to the Order of the British Empire.  The nomination system implemented by Major remains the basis for the modern system, a mix of nominations made by government departments, public bodies and the general public.

The withdrawal of the BEM was criticised by some deputy lieutenants as disenfranchising part of the community, who might not be eligible for higher honours.  Nominations for the civilian medal were resumed by prime minister David Cameron in 2011, though the rank distinction for military awards was not re-introduced and military awards of the BEM were not resumed.

At the time of his review Major decided to retain the Order of the British Empire, which some considered anachronistic. He has since come to the opinion that it would be better to rename it the Order of British Excellence and renaming the positions as Member, Order and Companion retaining the current abbreviations (MBE for member, OBE for officer and CBE for commander).  This proposal was made by the Public Administration Select Committee's  2005 review of the honours system.  While prime minister Tony Blair's government at the time reaffirmed its commitment to Major's principle of awards for merit they rejected the committee's recommendation for changes to the order.

Major did not initially change the general policy of not honouring pop and rock musicians.  Neil and Tim Finn of Crowded House were made OBE in the 1993 Birthday Honours, but this was still described as "surreal" in Q magazine.  After Tony Blair became Labour leader, a number of pop and rock musicians were honoured in 1995 and 1996 including, in the 1997 New Year Honours, a knighthood for Paul McCartney, although this was dismissed as "sentimental populism" by The Guardian in an editorial which suggested that "the real test of daring would have been to award honours to Oasis".  After the change of government in 1997, which brought into power people much more attuned to pop and rock music, the numbers of people from these fields being honoured steadily increased and, although no members of Oasis have yet been honoured, this trend has accelerated over time, with MBEs eventually being given to grime pioneers Wiley and Dizzee Rascal.

Military awards 
In the British military some awards are made for gallantry and others for meritorious service.  British gallantry awards are divided into operational and non-operational awards, the latter being awarded for actions "not in the face of the enemy". There had been calls, as early as the 1930s, for separate gallantry awards for officers and other ranks to be abolished but these had not progressed.  The Ministry of Defence's 1993 review, which was implemented between 1993 and 1995, largely focussed on these awards.  It retained the basic structure of the awards, being divided into four tiers, but removed the rank distinctions.

Non-operational awards 

Awards of the Air Force Cross for meritorious service ceased, being replaced by the MBE or OBE.  The medal became an award purely for gallantry not in the face of the enemy and was extended to all ranks.   The Air Force Medal, previously awarded to other ranks for similar conduct, ceased to be awarded.   The Queen’s Commendation for Valuable Service in the Air, which had previously been used to recognise both meritorious conduct and gallantry, was replaced. Two new awards were introduced; the Queen's Commendation for Valuable Service recognised meritorious service by military personnel in any non-operational circumstance and the Queen's Commendation for Bravery in the Air was awarded for gallantry in the air.  The Queen's Commendation for Brave Conduct, awarded to military and civilians for non-operational gallantry, was replaced with the Queen's Commendation for Bravery to match the new aerial gallantry award.

Operational awards 

The Victoria Cross, the only pre-1993 medal to be awarded to all ranks for gallantry, and the top level award was retained unchanged.  A new medal, the Conspicuous Gallantry Cross, was introduced as the second tier gallantry award for all ranks.  It replaced the Distinguished Service Order (DSO) for officers, when awarded for gallantry, and the Distinguished Conduct Medal (army), Conspicuous Gallantry Medal (navy), Conspicuous Gallantry Medal (Flying) (air force) for other ranks.  The DSO continues to be awarded for leadership in combat but is now open to all ranks.    The third level awards retained the distinction between services, with the formerly officers-only Military Cross (army), Distinguished Service Cross (navy) and Distinguished Flying Cross (air force) being opened to all ranks.  The Military Medal (army), Distinguished Service Medal (navy) and Distinguished Flying Medal (air force) previously awarded to other ranks, ceased to be awarded.  The Mention in Dispatches commendation was retained as the fourth level award but would only be awarded for gallantry, having previously been awarded for meritorious service.  A proposal to replace the award of an oak leaf to a campaign medal with a dedicated Mention in Dispatches Medal was not progressed, though the oak leaf was changed from bronze to silver.

References 

John Major
British honours system
1993 in the United Kingdom